The 2000 All Japan Grand Touring Car Championship was the eighth season of Japan Automobile Federation GT premiere racing. It was marked as well as the eighteenth season of a JAF-sanctioned sports car racing championship dating back to the All Japan Sports Prototype Championship. The GT500 class drivers' champion of 2000 was Ryo Michigami driving the No. 16 Castrol Mugen Honda NSX, with Mugen x Dome Project winning the teams' championship. The GT300 class drivers' champion was the No. 26 Advan Team Taisan Jr Porsche 996 driven by Hideo Fukuyama.

This season marked the first of several instances where the series champion had not won a single race throughout the season, with Michigami scoring four second places as the season champion's best finish. This phenomenon would occur again in 2001 (in GT500 only) and 2003 (in both GT500 and GT300).

Drivers and teams

GT500

Schedule

Season results

Standings

GT500 class

Drivers' standings
Scoring system

Teams' standings
For teams that entered multiple cars, only the best result from each round counted towards the teams' championship.

GT300 class (Top 5)

Drivers

References

External links
 Super GT/JGTC official race archive 
 2000 season results

Super GT seasons
JGTC